Manita Hang (born 7 September 1998) is a French-Cambodian model and beauty pageant titleholder who was crowned Miss Universe Cambodia 2022. She represented Cambodia at the Miss Universe 2022.

Early life
Manita Hang was born to a French father and a Cambodian mother and is of Franco-Cambodian descent. She is fluent in Khmer, French, and English. On the academic front, Manita attended the Lycée Français René Descartes in Phnom Penh, Cambodia. In December 2021, she graduated from CamEd Business School in Phnom Penh with a bachelor's degree in accounting and finance.

Pageantry

Miss Tourism Cambodia 2015 
Manita started her beauty pageant career in 2015, she was crowned Miss Tourism Cambodia 2015.

Miss Tourism Metropolitan International 2016 
On November 18, 2016, Manita represented Cambodia at Miss Tourism International Metropolitan 2016 at Nagaworld Hotel in Phnom Penh and placed third to Amanda Obdam, who represented Thailand and entered the Top 10 at Miss Universe 2020.

Miss Universe Cambodia 2022 
On June 15, 2022, Hang won the Miss Universe Cambodia 2022 pageant held at Bayon TV Steung Meanchey Studio in Phnom Penh.

Miss Universe 2022 
As Miss Universe Cambodia, Manita represented Cambodia at the Miss Universe 2022 where she failed to advance to the semifinals.

References

 

Miss Universe 2022 contestants
1998 births
Living people
Cambodian beauty pageant winners
Cambodian female models
People from Phnom Penh
Cambodian people of French descent